The Centre Fraternal is a casino and cultural center placed in Palafrugell (Baix Empordà) active since 1887. It is placed in a nineteenth-century building which, protected as Local Cultural Interest Heritage building.

The building
It is a large building, ground floor and first floor, the corner from the Plaça Nova and Carrer Sant Sebastià. The main facade is an interesting unit. It has a symmetrical distribution of the openings, the ground floor is rectangular (three central windows and two side doors). At a high level this floor are five other similar types of openings that illuminate the inner room. On the main floor there is a balcony run central three bays of arch supported by corbels decorated and has on each side a window of the same type. The top is supported by corbels cornice with simple railing balusters work with clay. The facade of the Sant Sebastà street typology is similar to the principal. The center still has interesting interior spaces.

Further reading 
 Oller, Oriol; Cervià, Yolanda. Fraternal (1887-2012) - 125 anys. Palafrugell: Centre Fraternal, 2012.
 Bagué i Vilà, Enric. El Palafrugell popular. Tavernes, cafès, fondes, hostals, casinos, colles i cinemes. Ajuntament de Palafrugell/Diputació de Girona, 1995 (Quaderns de Palafrugell).
 Bonal Bastons, Teresa; Sàbat Ortiz. «El Centre Fraternal: més de cent anys d'història». A: Palacio Frugelli. Miscel·lània, 1989.
 Maruny Curto, Lluís. La biblioteca del Centre Fraternal de Palafrugell (1887-1939). Estudis del Baix Empordà, volum 30, 2011, pp. 183 – 212.
 Oller, Oriol. Música i festa a Palafrugell. Ajuntament de Palafrugell, 2010 (Quaderns de Palafrugell, núm. 19).
 Ferrer Gironés, Francesc. Els moviments socials a les comarques gironines. Diputació de Girona, 1998.

External links 

 

Cultural centers
Baix Empordà
Buildings and structures in the Province of Girona